Drama was an important part of the Edinburgh International Festival from its earliest days, with performances taking place at the Royal Lyceum Theatre, the Assembly Hall, the Gateway Theatre and occasionally in other venues.

The first company to appear was The Old Vic Theatre Company who returned many times later, together with a series of visiting companies from Britain and abroad.

List

See also
Edinburgh International Festival
Drama at the Edinburgh International Festival: history and repertoire, 1957–1966
Opera at the Edinburgh International Festival: history and repertoire, 1947–1956
Opera at the Edinburgh International Festival: history and repertoire, 1957–1966
Opera at the Edinburgh International Festival: history and repertoire, 1967–1976
Ballet at the Edinburgh International Festival: history and repertoire, 1947–1956
Ballet at the Edinburgh International Festival: history and repertoire, 1957–1966
Ballet at the Edinburgh International Festival: history and repertoire, 1967–1976
Musicians at the Edinburgh International Festival, 1947 to 1956
Musicians at the Edinburgh International Festival, 1957–1966
Visual Arts at the Edinburgh International Festival, 1947–1976
World premieres at the Edinburgh International Festival

References

Edinburgh Festival
Annual events in Edinburgh
Theatre-related lists